Miss Model of the World 2009, the 20th edition of Miss Model of the World beauty pageant, was held in Shenzhen, China, where 66 delegates around the world competed for the crown. Eméne Alexandra Nyame of France was crowned Miss Model of the World 2009 by overcoming titleholder Maria Lakimuk of Ukraine.

Results

Placements

Special awards
Miss Friendship -  - GanAwardstagoo Bayarkhuu

Miss Photogenic -  -  YAwardsuliya Galichenko

Best National Costume -  - Derya Limen,  - AwardsGantagoo Bayarkhuu,  - Wang Shan

Best in Evening Gown -  - LaAwardsn Huong Ngoc Nguyen

Best in Swimsuit -  - Sabina OvaAwardsriova

Best in Talent -  - Natalie Jean Sangster, Awards - Liisa Maria Löoke,  - Dragana Dujović

Best in Figure -  - EAwardsméne Alexandra Nyame

Best Skin -  - LinAwardsa Maria Gómez Espinosa

Best in Media Impression -  -  YAwardsuliya Galichenko

Miss Charity Ambassador -  - Bo Bo Wang

Remainder 
ALBANIA - Krist Petraj ZicishtiAwards

BELGIUM - Emmely PolenAwards

BULGARIA - Nikol VasilevaAwards

CANADA - Jenna-Lee CreelmanAwards

CONGO - Munze BinuamanzaAwards

CRIMEA (Ukraine) - Yuliya ObukhovaAwards

CZECH REPUBLIC - Eliska PospislovaAwards

DENMARK - Cana BertelsenAwards

ESTONIA - Liisa Maria LöokeAwards

ETHIOPIA - Bewunetwa Abebe MekuriyaAwards

GEORGIA - Zina MstoyaniAwards

GERMANY - Nina RittinghausAwards

GHANA - Angela SurajiAwards

GREECE - Vasiliki EfthymiouAwards

HOLLAND - Doreth LangelaarAwards

ITALY - Elena PiccardoAwards

KAZAKHSTAN - Vera StarkovaAwards

KENYA - Ruth Nyambura KinuthiaAwards

KOREA - Kyoung-sil SonAwards

KOSOVO - Roberta GjokaAwards

LATVIA - Kristine SedmaleAwards

LITHUANIA - Vilmante SimanaviciuteAwards

MACEDONIA - Andjela BosheskaAwards

MARGARITA ISLAND (VEN) - Jéssica de Abreu RodríguezAwards

MEXICO - Maria Fernanda Maldonado CañasAwards

MOLDOVA - Irina NegaraAwards

NAMIBIA - Elizabeth ValomboleniAwards

NIGERIA - Ishola TayoAwards

NORWAY - Cathrine GulliksenAwards

PHILIPPINES - Jaysel Morelos ArrozalAwards

RUSSIA - Kristina AzarovaAwards

SOUTH AFRICA - Charlotte SmithAwards

SWEDEN - Madelene NordAwards

TAIWAN - Mi LeeAwards

UJRUGUAY - Camila Fernández CarvalhoAwards

U.S.A. - Lexie GuerreroAwards

Replaced 
VENEZUELA - Aswan Yarbouh

References

External links
 Miss Model of the World Website

Miss Model of the World
2009 beauty pageants
2009 in China
Beauty pageants in China

it:Miss Model of the World